Osborn is a patronymic surname derived from the Old English first name Osbeorn and possibly the Old Norse name Ásbjörn, such as the Old Norman first name Osbern it sometimes translates and may refer to:

Fictional characters
 Norman Osborn/Green Goblin, a fictional character from Spider-Man
 Harry Osborn, son of Norman Osborn
 Normie Osborn, son of Harry Osborn
 Liz Osborn, ex-wife of Harry Osborn

Literature and arts
 Alex Faickney Osborn (1888–1966), American author
 Daisy Osborn (1888–1957), New Zealand artist
 John Jay Osborn, Jr. (born 1947), American novelist, writer, and legal scholar
 Paul Osborn (1901–1988), playwright and screenwriter
 Robert C. Osborn (1904–1994), American satiric cartoonist, illustrator and author
 Joe Osborn (born 1937), American electric bass player

Military
 Sir George Osborn, 4th Baronet (1742–1818), British military officer and MP, son of Danvers Osborn 
 Henry Osborn (Royal Navy officer) (1694–1771), naval officer and Commodore Governor of Newfoundland
 John Robert Osborn (1899–1941), Canadian war hero
 Philip Osborn, British air force officer and Chief of Defence Intelligence 
 Sherard Osborn (1822–1875), English military officer
 Thomas W. Osborn (1833–1898), American military officer and politician

Politics
 Albert L. Osborn (1858–1940), American state politician
 Chase Osborn (1860–1949), American politician
 Sir Danvers Osborn, 3rd Baronet (1715–1753), colonial governor of New York in 1753
 David L. Osborn (1921–1994), United States ambassador
 Sir John Osborn, 5th Baronet (1772–1848), English politician
 Jones Osborn (1921–2014), American politician and newspaper editor
 Laura Freele Osborn (1866–1955), American educator and politician
 Sidney Preston Osborn (1884–1948), American politician
 Steve Osborn, American politician

Science
 Elburt F. Osborn (1911–1998), American geochemist
 Francis C. Osborn, Sr. (1856–1926), American inventor
 Frederick Osborn (1889–1981), American eugenicist
 Henry Fairfield Osborn (1857–1935), American geologist and paleontologist
 Herbert Osborn (1856–1954), American entomologist
 Hugh Osborn, British physicist
 John Jay Osborn, American physician
 Mary Jane Osborn (born 1927), American molecular biologist

Sports
 Ben Osborn (born 1994) English footballer
 Harold Osborn (1899–1975), American athlete
 John Osborn (sailor) (born 1945), British Olympic sailor
 K. J. Osborn (born 1997), American football player
 Philip Osborn (swimmer), English swimmer

Others
 Albert S. Osborn (1858–1946), American questioned document examiner
 Arthur Osborn (murderer) (1905–1928), executed for the murder of Fred N. Selak, the Hermit of Grand Lake, Colorado
 Denise R. Osborn, Australian and British economist
 Derrill Osborn, American fashion executive
 Eric Osborn (1922–2007), Australian theologian
 Henry Fairfield Osborn, Jr. (1887–1969), American environmentalist
 Howard J. Osborn (1918-1984), Former Director of Security at the CIA 
 John E. Osborn (lawyer) (born 1957), American lawyer, health care industry executive, diplomat
 Samuel Osborn (1848–1936), British surgeon
 Theodore Osborn (1887–1973), Professor of botany in Australia
 William A. Osborn (born 1947), American banker
 William Church Osborn (1862–1951), American philanthropist
 William H. Osborn (1820–1894), 19th-century railroad tycoon

See also
 Osborne (disambiguation)
 Osbourne (disambiguation)
 Osborn (disambiguation)
 Osbern (disambiguation)

Patronymic surnames